The Safari Rally is a rally held in Kenya. It was first held in 1953 as a celebration of the coronation of Queen Elizabeth II. The event was part of the World Rally Championship from 1973 until 2002, before returning in 2021. It is historically regarded as one of the toughest events in the World Rally Championship, and one of the most popular rallies in Africa. From 2003, a historical event (East African Safari Rally) has been held biannually.

History 
It was first held from 27 May to 1 June 1953 as the East African Coronation Safari in Kenya, Uganda and Tanganyika, as a celebration of the coronation of Queen Elizabeth II. In 1960 it was renamed the East African Safari Rally and kept that name until 1974, when it became the Safari Rally. From 1973, the rally was part of the World Rally Championship.

The  route featured a variety of roads and terrain - from fesh fesh (very fine powdered sand), fast farm tracks, and very rough roads up or down the Great Rift Valley. In heavy rain, roads would often turn into thick, deep mud. The event was run on open roads, with all of the route being competitive mileage. The driver with the lowest accumulation of penalty time between time controls was declared the winner.

However, the roughness of the terrain and the long stages meant that the winner was often the most reliable or the fastest cautious driver. In later years, top rally teams would use helicopters to fly ahead of the cars to warn of animals or other vehicles on the rally route.Teams built specially strengthened cars for the event, with bullbars, snorkels (for river crossings) and bright lights to warn wildlife. In the 1990s, Toyota Team Europe had a full-time test team in Kenya, preparing and testing the rally cars for the event. During the rally, repairs had to be regularly made to the cars, which added to the elapsed time of the competitors. In later years, tyre mousse - allowing tyres to maintain functionality despite a puncture - allowed drivers to tackle the event flat out, despite the length of the event.

In 1996, the event adopted the special stage format, and servicing cars from helicopters was prohibited. This meant that the winner's total time penalty was above 12 hours in 1996 and decreased to two seconds shy of 8 hours in 2002. Despite this, the rally continued to be run on open roads. The event was excluded from the WRC calendar due to a lack of finance and organisation in 2003.

Modern event 
From the 2003 edition, the event became part of the African Rally Championship. The event was modernised, with shorter stages and running on closed roads - like other events in the World Championship. Two editions of the rally - 2007 and 2009 - were also part of the Intercontinental Rally Challenge. In 2013, President of Kenya Uhuru Kenyatta announced a plan to return the Safari Rally to the world championship.

On the 27 September 2019, it was announced that the 2020 edition would be part of the World Rally Championship. This event was later cancelled due to the COVID-19 pandemic. The Safari Rally eventually made a comeback to the WRC in 2021 after an eighteen-year hiatus from the 24–27 June, with a successful event held in Kenya on the floor of the Rift Valley in Naivasha, Nakuru County. Sebastian Ogier and Julien Ingrassia emerged as winners in their Toyota Yaris WRC. The Safari has a WRC contract until 2026.

Past winners
Kenyan drivers Shekhar Mehta and Carl Tundo have been the most successful competitors, with five outright victories each. Mehta won first in 1973, then consecutively from 1979 to 1982 - all while the event was part of the world championship. Tundo won five editions when the event was part of the African Rally Championship - the 2004, 2009, 2011, 2012 and 2018 events. Tundo has also finished on the podium twelve times, ahead of fellow Kenyan Ian Duncan with nine podium finishes.

Notes: IMC = International Championship for Manufacturers, WRC = World Rally Championship, 2LWC = 2-Litre World Cup, ARC = African Rally Championship, IRC = Intercontinental Rally Challenge, KRC = Kenya National Rally Championship

East African Safari Rally (classic) 
The East African Safari Rally is a Classic rally event first held in 2003 to coincide with the 50th anniversary of the first running of the event. The event has since been held biennially. The 2017 edition of the rally had joint winners, as both Richard Jackson and Carl Tundo had the same time.

See also

 Safari Rally (1978 film)
 Safari 3000 (1982 film)

References

External links
   

 
Safari
Recurring sporting events established in 1953
World Rally Championship rallies
Coronation of Elizabeth II